Fintan McKeown is an Irish actor best known for his guest appearances on Star Trek: Voyager, Merlin, and Game of Thrones, and for his supporting roles in the films Immortal Beloved (1994) and Waking Ned Devine (1998).

Since beginning his career in 1985, McKeown has appeared in numerous films and television series produced in Ireland, Canada, the US and the United Kingdom.

Filmography

Personal life and politics
McKeown is married and a father of one. 
He stood in the 2017 and 2019 UK General Elections for the Green Party of England and Wales in the constituency of Windsor. On both occasions he finished fourth and lost his deposit.

McKeown also stood in the 2019 Windsor and Maidenhead Borough Council election, again unsuccessfully.

References

External links

Living people
Irish male film actors
Irish male television actors
Green Party of England and Wales parliamentary candidates
Year of birth missing (living people)